St. Lawrence Church is a Roman Catholic church located at 3680 Warsaw Avenue in Cincinnati, Ohio. It was the first Catholic church in the Cincinnati neighborhood of Price Hill.  The church was built on one of the highest hilltops in Cincinnati. The mother parish was St. Michael's in Lower Price Hill.

St Lawrence Church was organized at Mt. St. Mary's Seminary in 1868 under the direction of Rev. J. M. Bonner. A tract of land was purchased and a building erected which was dedicated June 12, 1870. In 1886, work was begun on the present Gothic structure, and the cornerstone was laid October 16, 1886. The basement was dedicated May 22, 1887. The superstructure was completed and the new church dedicated September 30, 1894 by Archbishop William Henry Elder. The new church is 72 × 165 feet and cost $106,000. In 1896, the congregation numbered 475 families.

The church is still operating today along with the elementary school attached. The current pastor is Fr. Mark Watkins and current school principal is Mr. Richard Klus. The school has over 30 faculty members serving preschool through eighth grade.

References

External links
St. Lawrence Parish official site
Cincinnati Memory
St. Lawrence Church, Price Hill, circa 1896
St. Lawrence Church, Price Hill 
Rev. George J. Mayerhoefer, Assistant Pastor, St. Lawrence's Church, circa 1896

Roman Catholic churches in Cincinnati
Catholic schools in Ohio